Idols 5 is the fifth season of the Dutch version of Idols hosted by Ruben Nicolai and Lieke van Lexmond and held in 2016.

Summaries

Contestants
(ages stated are at time of contest)

Liveshow Themes
Liveshow 1 (May 18, 2016): This is Me
Liveshow 2 (May 25, 2016): Heroes
Liveshow 3 (June 1, 2016): Semi Final
Liveshow 4 (June 8, 2016): Final

Judges
Martijn Krabbé
Jamai
Eva Simons
Ronald Molendijk

Elimination chart

Finals

Live show details

Live Show 1 (18 May 2016)
Theme: This is me

Live Show 2 (25 May 2016)
Theme: Heroes

Note that Jeffrey was eliminated after the first round of performances and thus only performed one song.

Live Show 3: Semi-final (1 June 2016)

Live final (8 June 2016)

Season 05
2016 Dutch television seasons